Carbonea aggregantula is a species of lichen belonging to the family Lecanoraceae.

It is a lichenicolous fungi, meaning that it grows on other lichens, but it does not cause disease, unlike the similar Carbonea austroshetlandica.

Distribution

Carbonea aggregantula is widely distributed. Although it has not been reported often, its distribution includes multiple continents. Carbonea aggregantula has been reported from some of the subantarctic islands, including King George Island, Penguin Island and Livingston Island.

Host species
Carbonea aggregantula has a wide range of host species which are still being discovered. Known hosts are:
 Candelariella sp.
 Lecanora alpigena
 Lecanora impudens
 Lecanora leproplaca
 Lecanora leucococca
 Lecanora polytropa
 Lecanora subaurea
 Lecanora subgranulata
 Protoparmeliopsis muralis
 Rhizoplaca aspidophora (synonym of Lecanora aspidophora)

References

Lecanoraceae
Lichen species
Lichens described in 1874
Lichens of the subantarctic islands
Taxa named by Johannes Müller Argoviensis